Lakha Singh (born 2 January 1965) is an Indian boxer. He competed in the men's heavyweight event at the 1996 Summer Olympics.

References

1965 births
Living people
Indian male boxers
Olympic boxers of India
Boxers at the 1996 Summer Olympics
Place of birth missing (living people)
Asian Games bronze medalists for India
Asian Games medalists in boxing
Boxers at the 1994 Asian Games
Medalists at the 1994 Asian Games
Heavyweight boxers
Recipients of the Dhyan Chand Award